The Waechter Baronetcy, of Ramsnest in the Parish of Chiddingfold in the County of Surrey, was a title in the Baronetage of the United Kingdom. It was created on 13 February 1911 for the businessman and philanthropist Harry Waechter. He was the son of Sir Max Waechter. Waechter was succeeded by his son, the second Baronet. On his death in 1985 the title became extinct.

Waechter baronets, of Ramsnest (1911)
Sir Harry Waechter, 1st Baronet (1871–1929)
Sir Harry Leonard d'Arcy Waechter, 2nd Baronet (1912–1985)

References

Extinct baronetcies in the Baronetage of the United Kingdom